Getting Over the Storm is the eighteenth studio album by English reggae band UB40. It was released on 2 September 2013. It is the final UB40 album to feature trumpet player and vocalist Astro, due to his departure in late 2013.

Background and release
Their first album since the 2010 album Labour of Love IV, it features cover versions of songs either written or recorded by country music artists together with five original UB40 songs. The country music tracks include the Randy Travis song "On the Other Hand",' George Jones' "Getting Over the Storm", Willie Nelson's "Blue Eyes Crying in the Rain", Buck Owens  "Crying Time" and Jim Reeves' "He'll Have to Go". Upon the album's release UB40 singer Astro defended the inclusion of country music on a UB40 album, saying, "In the Caribbean, there are very few households that do not own a Jim Reeves album. I certainly had them in my house, as did all my West Indian friends when I was growing-up. When you'd go their houses you'd always see Jim Reeves staring back at you from the Blue Spot Gramophone! Country music and Jamaica are so finely entwined." However, just two months later Astro had quit the band, citing the album's musical direction as a major factor in his decision: "My heart just isn't in the new album where my contribution has been reduced to a backing vocalist which, as our fans know, is not my role in the group. I'm a front man, a lead vocalist. While it may be true there is a long relationship with reggae musicians and country music, that doesn't mean that's what I want to play, far from it, and it's definitely not something I wish to be part of."

Track listing

Release history

Chart positions

External links

References

2013 albums
UB40 albums
Covers albums
Virgin Records albums
Universal Music Group albums